PR/SET domain 15 is a protein that in humans is encoded by the PRDM15 gene.

PRDM15 safeguards naive pluripotency by transcriptionally regulating WNT and MAPK-ERK signaling.

PRDM15 modulates WNT and MAPK-ERK signaling by directly promoting the expression of Rspo1 (R-spondin1) and Spry1 (Sprouty1). Mzoughi et al., have shown that PRDM15 binds to the promoter region of both genes, inducing changes in the local chromatin to promote their transcription. In a second report, the same team has identified a LOF mutation in patients with Holoprosencphaly and microcephaly. They used mouse models and Embryonic Stem Cells to uncover an unexpected link between Notch and WNT/PCP signaling and early embryo patterning. Both pathways are deregulated in PRDM15 mutants, leading to patterning defects and a spectrum of anterior brain malformations.

PRDM15 loss of function links NOTCH and WNT/PCP signaling to patterning defects in holoprosencephaly
https://doi.org/10.1126/sciadv.aax9852

References 

PRDM15 loss of function links NOTCH and WNT/PCP signaling to patterning defects in holoprosencephaly https://doi.org/10.1126/sciadv.aax9852

https://doi.org/10.1126/sciadv.aax9852